Poage is a surname. Notable people with the surname include:

Chester Poage (1980–2000), American murder victim
George Poage (1880–1962), American athlete
Ray Poage (1940–1997), American football player
William R. Poage (1899–1987), American politician

See also
Pöge